Glee: The Music, The Christmas Album, Volume 4 is the seventh and final extended play (EP) by the cast of the American musical television series Glee. It features six songs from the fifth season. It was released on December 3, 2013.

Track listing

References

Glee (TV series) albums
2013 Christmas albums
Pop Christmas albums
Columbia Records EPs
2013 EPs
Columbia Records Christmas albums